Pope John Paul II Day is a Polish festival celebrated every year on October 16. It was established by the Polish Parliament as a tribute to Pope John Paul II. In parallel, it is celebrated by the Catholic Church in Poland as Papal Day, which falls on the Sunday preceding the anniversary of the election of Karol Wojtyła as Pope.

The significance of the date 

On October 16, 1978, the Archbishop of Kraków Cardinal Karol Wojtyła was elected as Pope and took the name John Paul II. He was the first Pope in 455 years who was not Italian. 

On the same day in 2002, Pope John Paul II introduced the Luminous Mysteries of the Rosary.

The establishment of the holiday 

October 16 was established as an official celebration by the Polish Parliament on 27 July 2005 - as stated in the resolution - "a tribute to the greatest authority of the twentieth century, a man who reached into the sources of Christianity, taught us solidarity, courage and humility" ("w hołdzie największemu autorytetowi XX wieku, człowiekowi, który sięgając do źródeł chrześcijaństwa, uczył nas solidarności, odwagi i pokory"). 

The law establishing the holiday was supported by 338 deputies, three were against and two abstained.

The history of the holiday 

The day was celebrated for the first time in 2001 but is not a day off from work.

Papal Day in the Polish Catholic Church 

Since 2001, the Polish Catholic Church has celebrated Papal Day, a day of gratitude, communion with Pope John Paul II and the promotion of his teaching. It falls on the Sunday before October 16. The coordinator of the day is the Foundation Work of the New Millennium. On Papal Day, money is raised for scholarships for talented Polish youth from low-income and poor families.

Themes for Papal Day

See also 

 World Youth Day
 Public holidays in Poland

References

Bibliography 
 Ustawa z dnia 27 lipca 2005 r. o ustanowieniu 16 października Dniem Papieża Jana Pawła II 
 Dzień Papieski – information in Polish about past Papal Days

Public holidays in Poland
Autumn events in Poland
Pope John Paul II